Franklin Paul Rogers (1905-1990) was an American tattoo artist. He trained under Cap Coleman in Norfolk, Virginia from 1945-1950. He designed tattoo machines, which he called "irons", a term he coined that is used in the industry. People from all over the world would visit him in his “Iron Factory” where he taught them about tattoo machine building. In his early life, he was in the traveling circus. He is buried at Greenlawn Memorial Park Cemetery in Chesapeake, Virginia.

References

1905 births
1990 deaths
American tattoo artists
People from Bryson City, North Carolina
Artists from Norfolk, Virginia